MacLeod Andrews is an American actor and audiobook narrator. He has won 15 Earphone Awards, and 2 Audie Awards, as well as acting awards.

Personal life 
Andrews was born and raised in Louisville, Kentucky and graduated from Middlebury College. He presently lives in Los Angeles with his wife and daughters.

Andrews is a member of Rising Phoenix Repertory, a theatre company based in New York City.

Awards and honors

Awards

"Best of" lists

Filmography

References

External links 

 Official website

21st-century American actors
Audiobook narrators
Male actors from Louisville, Kentucky
Year of birth missing (living people)
Living people